Danelectro is a brand of musical instruments and accessories, founded in Red Bank, New Jersey in 1947. The company is known primarily for its string instruments that employed unique designs and manufacturing processes. The Danelectro company was sold to the "Music Corporation of America" (MCA) in 1966, moving to a much larger plant in Neptune City, New Jersey, employing more than 500 people. Nevertheless, three years later Danelectro closed its plant.

In the late 1990s, the Evets Corporation started selling instruments and accessories under the Danelectro name. In 2016, Danelectro introduced new models, including a resonator guitar.

Some of the products manufactured by Danelectro include electric and resonator guitars, basses, electric sitars, amplifiers, pickups, and effects units.

History

Throughout the late 1940s, the company produced amplifiers for Sears, Roebuck and Company and Montgomery Ward, branded Silvertone and Airline respectively.

Later, Danelectro added hollow-bodied guitars, constructed of Masonite and poplar to save costs and increase production speed, intending to produce no-frills guitars of reasonably good tone at low cost. These instruments were branded either as Danelectro or for Sears as Silvertone, distinguished by the Silvertone maroon vinyl covering, and the Danelectro light-colored tweed covering. The guitars used concentric stacked tone/volume knobs on the two-pickup models of both series and "lipstick-tube" pickups, which contained the pickup components inside metal tubes.

In 1956, Danelectro introduced the six-string bass guitar. Though the model never became popular, it found an enduring niche in Nashville and Los Angeles for "tic-tac" bass lines.

In 1966, Danelectro was sold to the "Music Corporation of America" (MCA). A year later, in 1967, they introduced the Coral line, known for its hollow-bodies and electric sitars.

In 1969, Danelectro closed down, burdened by MCA's attempt to market Danelectros to small guitar shops rather than large department stores.

In the late 1990s, importer The Evets Corporation purchased the Danelectro brand name, marketing recreations of old Silvertone and Danelectro guitars, and newly designed effects pedals and small amplifiers made in China. After initially selling well, guitar sales slowed and Danelectro stopped selling guitars after 2001 (2004 on official site) to concentrate on effects pedals. In 2006 (2005 on official site), new owners of Evets decided on a new marketing model for guitars, selling a limited number each year.

Guitars

Danelectro C
Danelectro Cs were put into production and retailed from 1954 to 1955 until being replaced by the Danelectro U model in 1956. Unlike most all the later Danelectro instruments, the C model was a solid body construction made of poplar and came in a peanut-like body shape.

Danelectro U2
The Danelectro U2 is a dual-pickup hollow bodied guitar made of Masonite and shaped similar to a Les Paul model guitar. It was the most enduringly popular of the U-series. A single-pickup version (the U1) and triple-pickup version (the U3), were manufactured and sold alongside the U2. They were originally made from the years 1956 to 1958. It was re-issued in the late 1990s, in 2006 in a slightly modified form as the '56 Pro, and again in 2010 as the '56 Single Cutaway.

Danelectro Shorthorn
The Danelectro Shorthorn line of guitars are a dual cutaway hollow bodied design, made of Masonite and poplar. The original models were introduced in 1959

Danelectro Dano Pro
The Danelectro Dano Pro is an electric guitar made by Danelectro in 1963 and 1964, reissued in 2007 and again in 2012. The original was a 3/4 scale guitar with a single lipstick tube pickup. The reissue features two, rather than one pickup.

Effects pedals

The FAB series of guitar effect pedals is a budget range of pedals made by the Danelectro company that are manufactured in China. The series was launched in 2005 with the release of the FAB Distortion, FAB Overdrive and the FAB Metal pedals. Currently, eight pedals share the same distinctive injection moulded plastic casing and blue LED light. Each has a mains power DC9 socket, or can be powered by a 9 volt battery. They market eight pedals lines: original effects, FAB effects, mini effects, vintage effects, Wasabi effects, Paisley effects, Cool Cat effects and other miscellaneous effects. All run on 9 volt batteries or power adapters. The original effects featured metal enclosures and FET switching. Cool Cat models were designed with metal enclosures and true-bypass switching. Danelectro began rolling out Cool Cat V2 pedals, featuring extra 'under the hood' features. Mini effects pedals are smaller, compact pedals with effects resembling those of the original effects and the FAB effects. Vintage effects include the large, rectangular Spring King and Reel Echo effect pedals. The discontinued Paisley series featured paisley-patterned drive effects in original style enclosures. The Wasabi series features large, futuristic-looking metal enclosures. FAB effects are the cheapest of the bunch, and feature plastic enclosures somewhat larger than the Mini effects series.

In 2006, Danelectro sold a carrying case that holds up to five mini effects. When the player is ready to play, the top could be removed and the bottom acts as a pedals board. It was shortly been discontinued. Not long after, another carrying case was developed to fit five FAB or Cool Cat pedals, as well as serve in the pedal board function as well.

Despite the advantages of the mini effects, FAB effects are more common. The Mini effects are less expensive, but the plastic construction makes them fragile.

See also
 List of Danelectro players (historic musicians that played Danelectro guitars)

Bibliography

Notes

References

External links

 Official website
 Tribute to Danelectro founder Nathan I. Daniel

1947 establishments in New Jersey
Electronics companies established in 1947
Guitar amplifier manufacturers
Guitar effects manufacturing companies
Guitar manufacturing companies of the United States